Ulrich Schulte-Wülwer (born 15 December 1944, Meppen) is a German art historian, specializing in north German painters of the 19th and 20th centuries.

Life

Selected works 
 Das Nibelungenlied in der deutschen Kunst und Kunstliteratur zwischen 1806 und 1871. Philosophische Fakultät der Universität Kiel, Dissertation, 1974.
 Das Nibelungenlied in der deutschen Kunst des 19. und 20. Jahrhunderts (= Kunstwissenschaftliche Untersuchungen des Ulmer Vereins, Verband für Kunst- und Kulturwissenschaften. Bd. 9). Anabas, Gießen 1980,  (zugleich: Kiel, Universität, Dissertation, 1974).
 (editor) Käte Lassen (1880–1956). Städtisches Museum Flensburg. Begleitheft anlässlich der Ausstellung im Städtischen Museum, 2.11.–7.12.1980. Städtisches Museum, Flensburg 1980.
 Schleswig-Holstein in der Malerei des 19. Jahrhunderts. Hrsg. von der Brandkasse-Provinzial-Versicherungsgruppe, Kiel. Boyens, Heide 1980, .
 Bildführer. Städtisches Museum Flensburg. Städtisches Museum, Flensburg 1981.
 Herbert Marxen (1900–1954). Ein Flensburger Karikaturist in den letzten Jahren der Weimarer Republik. Ausstellung im Städtischen Museum Flensburg vom 17.10.–28.11.1982/im Kieler Stadt- und Schiffahrtsmuseum vom 30.1.–27 March 1983. [hrsg. vom Städt. Museum Flensburg], Städtisches Museum, Flensburg 1982.
 Künstlerkolonie Ekensund am Nordufer der Flensburger Förde. Boyens, Heide 2000.
 Föhr, Amrum und die Halligen in der Kunst. Boyens, Heide 2003; völlig überarbeitete Neuausgabe 2012, .
 Künstlerinsel Sylt. Boyens, Heide 2005, .
 "Der Mann verdient Beachtung." Die Wiederentdeckung des Malers Sophus Hansen. Zur Ausstellung des Malers Sophus Hansen in Schloss Glücksburg vom 4. bis 29. Oktober 2009: Sophus Hansen – ein Malerleben zwischen Glücksburg, Hamburg und Weimar. Boyens, Heide 2009, .
 Sehnsucht nach Arkadien: Schleswig-Holsteinische Künstler in Italien. Boyens, Heide 2009, .

Bibliography 
 Marianne Risch-Stolz und Dorothee Bieske (ed.): 11:1. Finale Museumsberg Flensburg. Museumsberg Flensburg, Flensburg 2009 (anlässlich der Verabschiedung von Ulrich Schulte-Wülwer als Direktor des Museumsberges Flensburg im November 2009 erschienen).

External links 
 
  Erfolgreicher Direktor des Museumsbergs. Ulrich Schulte-Wülwer nimmt seinen Abschied in Flensburg., Kieler Nachrichten online, 25. November 2009

1944 births
German art historians
Living people

People from Meppen